McKenzie College was a college in Chattanooga, Tennessee.  Founded in the 1885 as Agey, Leavitt and Leavitt Business School.  The school was sold to J.A. and E.L. Wiley in 1890 and was renamed Wiley's Mountain City Business College.  Roy E. and H. Frank McKenzie purchased the institution in 1923 and it was renamed McKenzie College in 1930.

The institution closed in 1992.

References

https://www.cappex.com/colleges/tennessee-college-of-applied-technology-mckenzie

Universities and colleges in Chattanooga, Tennessee
Defunct private universities and colleges in Tennessee
1885 establishments in Tennessee
1992 disestablishments in Tennessee
Educational institutions established in 1885
Educational institutions disestablished in 1992